Stink Creek is a stream in the U.S. state of Georgia.  Despite its unappealing name, Stink Creek is a popular destination for fishing and other outdoor activities.

History 
The name "Stink Creek" is believed to have originated from the creek's odor, which was likely caused by the high sulfur content of the water. The area around Stink Creek was originally inhabited by the Cherokee people, and evidence of their presence can still be found in the area today. In the years following European settlement, the creek and surrounding land were used for farming and other agricultural purposes.

Recreation 
Today, Stink Creek is a popular destination for fishing, canoeing, kayaking, and other outdoor activities. The creek's waters are home to a variety of fish species, including smallmouth bass, rainbow trout, and brown trout. The creek's proximity to the Appalachian Trail also makes it a popular spot for hiking and camping.

Conservation 
To help preserve the natural beauty of Stink Creek, the Georgia Department of Natural Resources has designated the creek as a "Georgia Scenic River." This designation means that certain activities, such as clearing vegetation or building structures, are prohibited within 25 feet (7.6 meters) of the creek's banks. Additionally, efforts are ongoing to preserve and protect the quality of the creek's water.

References

Rivers of Georgia (U.S. state)
Rivers of Union County, Georgia